Israel Contreras (born December 27, 1960) is a Venezuelan former professional boxer who won the World Boxing Organization and World Boxing Association world bantamweight titles. He had a supporting role in the Mel Gibson film Apocalypto.

Boxing career
Contreras turned professional in 1981 and lost his first title fight to WBA super flyweight title holder Khaosai Galaxy by KO in 1986.  He later moved up in weight and in 1990 captured the WBO bantamweight title with a TKO over Ray Minus.  Contreras vacated the title to fight Luisito Espinosa for WBA belt in 1991 and won by KO in the 5th.  He lost the belt in his first defense to Eddie Cook.  He retired in 1995 after a TKO loss to Johnny Vasquez.  Contreras collapsed in the hospital after the bout, but recovered.

External links

1960 births
Living people
People from La Guaira
Super-flyweight boxers
Bantamweight boxers
World bantamweight boxing champions
World Boxing Association champions
World Boxing Organization champions
Venezuelan male boxers